This  article is about the demographic features of the population of the Democratic Republic of the Congo, including ethnicity, education level, health, economic status, religious affiliations and other aspects of the population.

As many as 250 ethnic groups have been distinguished and named. The most numerous people are the Luba, Mongo, and Bakongo.

Although 700 local languages and dialects are spoken, the linguistic variety is bridged both by the use of French, and the intermediary languages Kikongo ya leta, Tshiluba, Swahili, and Lingala.

Population

The CIA World Factbook estimated the population to be over 105 million as of 2022 (the exact number being 108,407,721), now exceeding that of Vietnam (with 98,721,275 inhabitants as of 2020) and ascending the country to the rank of 14th most populous in the world. The proportion of children below the age of 14 in 2020 was 46.38%, 51.15% of the population was between 15 and 65 years of age, while 2.47% was 65 years or older.

Population Estimates by Sex and Age Group (01.VII.2020):

Census
The first and so far only census conducted in DR Congo dates from 1984.

Vital statistics
Registration of vital events in the Democratic Republic of the Congo is incomplete. The Population Department of the United Nations prepared the following estimates.

Fertility and Births
Total Fertility Rate (TFR) (Wanted Fertility Rate) and Crude Birth Rate (CBR) for urban and rural areas:

The Wanted Fertility Rate is an estimate of what the fertility rate would be if all unwanted births were avoided.

Fertility data per province, as of 2014:

Life expectancy

Ethnic groups

More than 250 ethnic groups have been identified and named, of which the majority are Bantu. The four largest groups - Mongo, Luba, Kongo (all Bantu), and the Mangbetu-Azande collectively make up about 45% of the population. 5,000 people from Belgium and 5,000 people from Greece currently live in DR Congo.

Bantu peoples (80%):
Luba (18%), Mongo (17%), Kongo (12%)
Others: Ambala, Ambuun, Angba, Babindi, Baboma, Baholo, Bangala, Bango, Bapindi, Batsamba, Bazombe, Bemba, Bembe, Bira, Bowa, Dikidiki, Dzing, Fuliru, Havu, Hema, Hima, Hunde, Iboko, Kanioka, Kaonde, Kuba, Kumu, Kwango, Lengola, Lokele,Lunda, Lupu, Lwalwa, Mbala, Mbole, Mbuza (Budja), Nande, Ngoli, Bangoli, Ngombe, Nkumu, Nyanga, Pende, Popoi, Poto, Sango, Shi, Songo, Sukus, Tabwa, Chokwe, Téké, Tembo, Tetela, Topoke, Ungana, Vira, Wakuti, Yaka, Yakoma, Yanzi, Yéké, Yela etc.

Central Sudanic/Ubangian :
Ngbandi, Ngbaka, Manvu, Mbunja, Moru-Mangbetu, Zande, Lugbara

Nilotic peoples :
Alur, Kakwa, Bari, Logo

Pygmy peoples :
Mbuti, Twa, Baka, Babinga
More than 600,000 pygmies (around 1% of the total population) are believed to live in DR Congo, mainly in forests, where they survive by hunting wild animals and gathering fruits.

Languages

The four major languages in the DRC are French (official, from colonization), Lingala (a lingua franca, or trade language), Kingwana (a dialect of Swahili), Kikongo ya leta, and Tshiluba. In total, there are over 200 ethnic languages.

French is generally the language of instruction in schools. English is taught as a compulsory foreign language in Secondary and High Schools around the country. It is a required subject in the Faculty of Economics at major universities around the country and there are numerous language schools in the country that teach it. Former President Kabila himself is fluent in both English and French, as was his father.

Religions
A survey conducted by the Demographic and Health Surveys program in 2013–2014 indicated that Christians constituted 93.7% of the population (Catholics 29.7%, Protestants 26.8%, and other Christians 37.2%). An indigenous religion, Kimbanguism, was practiced by 2.8% of the population, while Muslims make up 1.2%.

Another estimate (by the Pew Research Center in 2010) found Christianity was followed by 95.8% of the population.

The CIA The World Factbook gives the following percentages: Roman Catholic 29.9%, Protestant 26.7%, Kimbanguist 2.8%, Other Christian 36.5%, Islam 1.3%, Other (includes Syncretic Sects and Indigenous beliefs) 2.7%.

The Joshua Project, a Christian missionary organisation, gives the following percentages: Roman Catholic 43.9%, Protestant 24.8%, Other Christian 23.7%, Muslim 1.6%, Non-religious 0.6%, Hindu 0.1% other syncretic sects and indigenous beliefs 5.3%.

Other demographic statistics 

These are some other demographic statistics according to the World Population Review in 2022.

One birth every 9 seconds	
One death every 38 seconds	
One net migrant every 111 minutes	
Net gain of one person every 11 seconds

The following demographic statistics are from the CIA World Factbook.

Population
108,407,721 (2022 est.)
85,281,024 (July 2018 est.)
Note: estimates for this country explicitly take into account the effects of excess mortality due to AIDS; this can result in lower life expectancy, higher infant mortality and death rates, lower population and growth rates, and changes in the distribution of population by age and gender than would otherwise be expected (July 2017 est.)

Religions
Roman Catholic 29.9%, Protestant 26.7%, other Christian 36.5%, Kimbanguist 2.8%, Muslim 1.3%, other (includes syncretic sects and indigenous beliefs) 1.2%, none 1.3%, unspecified 0.2% (2014 est.)

Age structure
0-14 years: 46.38% (male 23,757,297/female 23,449,057)
15-24 years: 19.42% (male 9,908,686/female 9,856,841)
25-54 years: 28.38% (male 14,459,453/female 14,422,912)
55-64 years: 3.36% (male 1,647,267/female 1,769,429)
65 years and over: 2.47% (male 1,085,539/female 1,423,782) (2020 est.)

0-14 years: 41.25% (male 17,735,697 /female 17,446,866)
15-24 years: 21.46% (male 9,184,871 /female 9,117,462)
25-54 years: 30.96% (male 13,176,714 /female 13,225,429)
55-64 years: 3.63% (male 1,472,758 /female 1,625,637)
65 years and over: 2.69% (male 974,293 /female 1,321,297) (2018 est.)

Median age
total: 16.7 years. Country comparison to the world: 222nd
male: 16.5 years
female: 16.8 years (2020 est.)

total: 18.8 years. Country comparison to the world: 206th
male: 18.6 years
female: 19 years (2018 est.)

Birth rate
40.08 births/1,000 population (2022 est.) Country comparison to the world: 7th
40.1 births/1,000 population (2020 est.)

Death rate
7.94 deaths/1,000 population (2022 est.) Country comparison to the world: 95th
9.1 deaths/1,000 population (2020 est.)

Total fertility rate
5.63 children born/woman (2022 est.) Country comparison to the world: 3rd
5.7 children born/woman (2020 est.)

Population growth rate
3.14% (2022 est.) Country comparison to the world: 9th
2.33% (2018 est.) Country comparison to the world: 31st
2.42% (2016)

Mother's mean age at first birth
19.9 years (2013/14 est.)
note: median age at first birth among women 25-29

Contraceptive prevalence rate
28.1% (2017/18)
20.4% (2013/14)

Net migration rate
-0.71 migrant(s)/1,000 population (2022 est.) Country comparison to the world: 131st
-0.1 migrant(s)/1,000 population (2018 est.) Country comparison to the world: 105th
-0.54 migrant(s)/1,000 population
note: fighting between the Congolese Government and Uganda- and Rwanda-backed Congolese rebels spawned a regional war in DRC in August 1998, which left 2.33 million Congolese internally displaced and caused 412,000 Congolese refugees to flee to surrounding countries (2011 est.)

Given the situation in the country and the condition of state structures, it is extremely difficult to obtain reliable data however evidence suggests that DRC continues to be a destination country for immigrants in spite of recent declines. Immigration is seen to be very diverse in nature, with refugees and asylum-seekers - products of the numerous and violent conflicts in the Great Lakes Region - constituting an important subset of the population in the country.

Additionally, the country's large mine operations attract migrant workers from Africa and beyond and there is considerable migration for commercial activities from other African countries and the rest of the world, but these movements are not well studied. Transit migration towards South Africa and Europe also plays a role. Immigration in the DRC has decreased steadily over the past two decades, most likely as a result of the armed violence that the country has experienced.

According to the International Organization for Migration, the number of immigrants in the DRC has declined from just over 1 million in 1960, to 754,000 in 1990, to 480,000 in 2005, to an estimated 445,000 in 2010. Valid figures are not available on migrant workers in particular, partly due to the predominance of the informal economy in the DRC. Data are also lacking on irregular immigrants, however given neighbouring country ethnic links to nationals of the DRC, irregular migration is assumed to be a significant phenomenon in the country.

Figures on the number of Congolese nationals abroad vary greatly depending on the source, from 3 to 6 million. This discrepancy is due to a lack of official, reliable data. Emigrants from the DRC are above all long-term emigrants, the majority of which live within Africa and to a lesser extent in Europe; 79.7% and 15.3% respectively, according to estimates on 2000 data. Most Congolese emigrants however, remain in Africa, with new destination countries including South Africa and various points en route to Europe.

In addition to being a host country, the DRC has also produced a considerable number of refugees and asylum-seekers located in the region and beyond. These numbers peaked in 2004 when, according to UNHCR, there were more than 460,000 refugees from the DRC; in 2008, Congolese refugees numbered 367,995 in total, 68% of which were living in other African countries.

Religions
Roman Catholic (55.8%), Other Christian (39.1%), Folk religion (2.5%), Islam (2.1%), None (0.5%)

Dependency ratios
total dependency ratio: 97.5 (2015 est.)
youth dependency ratio: 91.5 (2015 est.)
elderly dependency ratio: 6 (2015 est.)
potential support ratio: 16.8 (2015 est.)

Gender ratio
At birth: 1.03 male(s)/female
Under 15 years: 1.01 male(s)/female
15–64 years: 0.99 male(s)/female
65 years and over: 0.69 male(s)/female
Total population: 0.99 male(s)/female (2011 est.)

Life expectancy at birth
total population: 61.83 years. Country comparison to the world: 216th
male: 60.03 years
female: 63.69 years (2022 est.)

total population: 58.1 years (2018 est.) Country comparison to the world: 213rd
male: 56.5 years (2018 est.)
female: 59.7 years (2018 est.)

total population: 56.93 years
male: 55.39 years
female: 58.51 years (2015 est.)

Urbanization
urban population: 46.8% of total population (2022)
rate of urbanization: 4.33% annual rate of change (2020-25 est.)

urban population: 44.5% of total population (2018)
rate of urbanization: 4.53% annual rate of change (2015-20 est.)

HIV/AIDS

Adult prevalence rate: 0.7% (2017 est.)
People living with HIV/AIDS: 390,000 (2017 est.)
Deaths: 17,000 (2017 est.)

Major infectious diseases
Degree of risk: very high
Food or waterborne diseases: bacterial and protozoal diarrhea, hepatitis A, typhoid fever and ebola.
Vectorborne diseases: malaria, plague, and African trypanosomiasis (sleeping sickness) are high risks in some locations
Water contact disease: schistosomiasis (2005)

Nationality
Noun: Congolese (singular and plural)
Adjective: Congolese or Congo

Literacy
Definition: age 15 and over can read and write French, Lingala, Kingwana, or Tshiluba
Total population: 77%
Male: 88.5%
Female: 66.5% (2016 est.)

School life expectancy (primary to tertiary education)
total: 10 years (2013)
male: 11 years (2013)
female: 9 years (2013)

Unemployment, youth ages 15-24
total: 8.7% (2012 est.) Country comparison to the world: 134th
male: 11.3% (2012 est.)
female: 6.8% (2012 est.)

Congolese diaspora 

The table below shows DRC born people who have emigrated abroad in selected Western countries (although it excludes their descendants).

These are only estimates and do not account for Congolese migrants residing illegally in these and other countries.

See also
Congolese ethnic groups:
Alur
Azande
Chokwe
Hema
Kakwa
Lendu
Luba
Mangbetu
Twa
Yaka
Lunda
Other articles
 Health in the Democratic Republic of the Congo

References

External links 
  , International Rescue Committee, January 2008 (estimates 5.4 million excess deaths above sub-Saharan average from 1998 to 2007)

 
Society of the Democratic Republic of the Congo